Pugu may refer to:

 Pugu (state) or people of ancient China
 Pugu, tribe of the Tiele people
 Pugu (deity) of the Yukaghir
 Pugu Huai'en, a general of the Tang Dynasty
 Pugu Hills, a geographical region of Tanzania
 Pugu, Tanzania, a small town in the Pugu Hills
 Pugu Hills Forest Reserve, a nature reserve in the Pugu Hills
 Pugu tarkvara, an Estonian web-based software for businesses in the social welfare sector